Dood Tsagaan Lake (: lit. "lower white lake") is a lake in northwestern Khövsgöl aimag, Mongolia, between the sums of Tsagaannuur and Renchinlkhümbe. It's sometimes divided into the Targan, Dund, and Kharmai lakes. Targan lake is 3.5 meters deep, Dund nuur 5 meters and Kharmai nuur 15 meters.

Tsagaannuur's administrative center is located on the western shore of the lake.

Lakes of Mongolia
Khövsgöl Province